The 2020 Open de Cagnes-sur-Mer was a professional tennis tournament played on outdoor clay courts. It was the twenty-third edition of the tournament which was part of the 2020 ITF Women's World Tennis Tour. It took place in Cagnes-sur-Mer, France between 14 and 20 September 2020.

Singles main-draw entrants

Seeds

 1 Rankings are as of 31 August 2020.

Other entrants
The following players received wildcards into the singles main draw:
  Mariam Bolkvadze
  Chloé Paquet
  Diane Parry
  Harmony Tan

The following player received entry using a junior exempt:
  Clara Burel

The following player received entry through a special exempt:
  Cristina Bucșa

The following players received entry from the qualifying draw:
  Daria Gavrilova
  Ekaterine Gorgodze
  Elsa Jacquemot
  Séléna Janicijevic
  Varvara Lepchenko
  Carole Monnet
  Daniela Seguel
  Eden Silva

The following player received entry as a lucky loser:
  Nicoleta Dascălu

Champions

Singles

 Sara Sorribes Tormo def.  Irina Bara, 6–3, 6–4

Doubles

 Samantha Murray Sharan /  Julia Wachaczyk def.  Paula Kania /  Katarzyna Piter, 7–5, 6–2

References

External links
 2020 Open de Cagnes-sur-Mer at ITFtennis.com
 Official website

2020 ITF Women's World Tennis Tour
2020 in French tennis
September 2020 sports events in France
Open de Cagnes-sur-Mer